Pascal Raphael "Patsy" Giugliano (December 11, 1900 – May 1, 1976) was an American football player.  

Giugliano was born in 1900 in Louisville, Kentucky. He attended du Pont Manual Training High School where he was quarterback on the football team. 

Giugliano played professional football as a back for the Louisville Brecks in the National Football League (NFL). He appeared in one NFL game during the 1923 season.  He later worked as a promotional man for a circus.

Giugliano later worked as a promotional man for a circus. He died in 1976  at age 75.

References

1900 births
1976 deaths
Louisville Brecks players
Players of American football from Louisville, Kentucky